Lovely Thunder is a studio album by the American ambient artist Harold Budd. It was released in 1986 on E.G. Records. The vinyl release did not include "Valse Pour le Fin du Temps".

Track listing 
 "The Gunfighter" – 3:18
 "Sandtreader" – 5:33
 "Ice Floes in Eden" – 3:28
 "Olancha Farewell" – 2:18
 "Flowered Knife Shadows" – 7:15
 "Valse Pour le Fin du Temps" – 4:50
 "Gypsy Violin" – 20:49

Production
Arranged by Harold Budd
Produced & mixed by Harold Budd & Michael Hoenig, with track 5 mixed by Robin Guthrie
Engineered by Harold Budd, Michael Hoenig & Simon Raymonde

References 

Harold Budd albums
1986 albums
E.G. Records albums
Ambient albums by American artists